This is a list of people from the Gaspé Peninsula region of Quebec.

François Babin – Star Académie participant
Charles Belleau –  law professor
Martin Bérubé – actor, Bouscotte, SRC
La Bolduc – folk singer
Isabelle Boulay – singer
Manuel Brault – singer
Geneviève Bujold – actor
Véronique Claveau – Star Académie participant
Alain Côté – ice hockey player
Thérèse Tanguay Dion – television personality; mother of Céline Dion
Edmund James Flynn – tenth Premier of Quebec
Mathieu Garon – ice hockey player, Tampa Bay Lightning 
Sébastien Harrison – writer and scenarist
Laurence Jalbert – singer-songwriter
Pierre Labrie – poet
Pat The White (Patrick Le Blanc) – guitarist and singer
Bertrand B. Leblanc – writer
Paul LeDuc – wrestler
Alan LeGros – actor
Gérard D. Levesque – politician
Jean-Louis Lévesque – entrepreneur, philanthropist
René Lévesque – Premier of Quebec, leader of the first sovereignty referendum
Hazel McCallion – Mayor of Mississauga, Ontario
Josélito Michaud – animator
Esdras Minville – economist, sociologist, and university administrator
Nelson Minville – singer
Cédric Paquette – ice hockey player
Kevin Parent – singer-songwriter
François-Xavier Ross – first Bishop of diocese of Gaspé
Dave Roussy – Star Académie participant
Kathleen Sergerie – singer
Roch Thériault – cult leader

See also
Lists of people from Quebec by region
List of Quebecers
List of Quebec regions

+
Gaspe Peninsula